A list of extreme points and elevation in Jordan.

Elevation
Lowest point: Dead Sea: -408 m. (Also, lowest point on Earth.)
Highest point: Jabal Umm ad Dami: .

Extreme points
Northernmost point: tripoint with Syria and Iraq, Mafraq Governorate: 
Southernmost point: intersection of Amman-Tabuk railway with Jordan/Saudi Arabian border, Ma'an Governorate: 
Easternmost point: border with Iraq and Saudi Arabia, Mafraq Governorate: 
Westernmost point: border with Saudi Arabia at the Gulf of Aqaba, Aqaba Governorate:

See also

Extreme points of Earth
List of countries by northernmost point
List of countries by southernmost point
List of countries by easternmost point
List of countries by westernmost point

References

Geography of Jordan
Jordan